The Hatay Subregion (Turkish: Hatay Alt Bölgesi) (TR63) is a statistical subregion in Turkey.

Provinces 

 Hatay Province (TR631)
 Kahramanmaraş Province (TR632)
 Osmaniye Province (TR633)

See also 

 NUTS of Turkey

Sources 
 ESPON Database

External links 
 TURKSTAT 

Statistical subregions of Turkey